Sam Patrick Philip Campagna (born 19 November 1980) is an English former professional football defender.

Career
Born in Worcester, Campagna began his career as a trainee with Swindon Town, turning professional in August 1998. He made his debut on  14 November 1998, as a late substitute for Mark Walters, in Swindon's 3–0 defeat to Bradford City, having been an unused substitute the previous week. His only other game that season came on the final day when he came on for Brian Borrows late in Swindon's 3–1 defeat at home to Barnsley. He made three further appearances the following season before joining Bath City on loan in March 2000, playing in the final ten games of the season.

He was released by Swindon in May 2001 and joined Bromsgrove Rovers, moving on to Evesham United and then to Malvern Town in March 2002.

References

External lists

1980 births
Living people
Sportspeople from Worcester, England
Swindon Town F.C. players
Bath City F.C. players
Bromsgrove Rovers F.C. players
Evesham United F.C. players
Malvern Town F.C. players
English Football League players
English footballers
Association football defenders